The Subaru Sambar is a cabover truck and microvan manufactured and marketed by Subaru as Japan's first truck compliant with the country's strict Keitora (軽トラ) or Kei vehicle tax class. Introduced in 1961 in microvan and  Kei pickup configurations, the Sambar remains in production, now in its eighth generation —  beginning with the sixth generation as a rebadged Daihatsu Hijet. 

Since its introduction, the Sambar has used a rear engine, rear wheel drive layout with body-on-frame rather than unibody construction. The first two generations used the air-cooled engine from the Subaru 360 and later generations used the water-cooled engine from the Subaru Rex, Vivio and the Pleo.  Four-wheel drive became optional in 1980.  Sambar models were manufactured in China as the [三八] as well as in Finland in a joint venture with Elcat Automotive. Passenger variants of the Sambar were later marketed as the Subaru Dias Wagon.

With the Sambar, Subaru borrowed from the Type 2 (1951-1967) van — using a marketing name very similar to the Volkswagen's upper trim level, the Samba, and using a similar rear-drive, rear air-cooled engine,  passenger-cab-over-front-axle (cabover), configuration. The Sambar was the first Kei truck using a cabover design — and was the last Kei-compliant vehicle using a rear-engine, rear-drive layout.

First generation (1961–1966)

Introduced at the 1960 Tokyo Motor Show in passenger and commercial versions, the Sambar featured 4-wheel independent suspension, a rear engine, rear drive layout — and a one-box body configuration based on the Subaru 360 platform and inspired by the 1957 Fiat 600 Multipla. The chassis uses a ladder frame construction, with a rear torsion bar trailing arm suspension. The reverse gearshift position was a left-pattern selection, instead of a right-pattern selection, and the EK series engine could be accessed via a hatch inside the vehicle. As with the Subaru 360, front doors were rear-hinged. Rear doors were front-hinged, with a rear cargo hatch. Provisional camping bunk beds were available.

Commercial variants of the Sambar was marketed for delivery use, nicknamed the "kuchibiru ([lower] lip)" Sambar, inspired by a competior, the 1960-1960 Kurogane Baby. Other competitors included the front-engined Suzulight Carry which placed the engine in front of the driver, but also adopted the cabover approach in 1966, and the 1964 Daihatsu Hijet cabover.

The Subaru cabover configuration followed the 1950 Volkswagen Type 2, and was introduced the same year as the 1961 Ford Econoline, and the 1961 Chevrolet Greenbrier.

Second generation (1966–1973)

The redesigned Sambar debuted in January 1966 with revised styling and a truck variant. The second generation is nicknamed the "baban" Sambar.

The Sambar continued to use the 356 cc EK31 engine, but now in the  iteration used in the Subaru 360 since July 1964.

A raised roof for extended headroom was added to the options list in 1968. Starting with the 1970 model year, the engine was accessed from outside the vehicle, and the front doors were conventionally hinged. To enhance safety a full padded dash pad was introduced, sharing the dashboard panel from the new R–2. Along with the facelift, the engine was also updated (EK33) and now produced .

The styling was also revised, adding a faux front grille to create a more modern appearance as well as bringing the corporate look of the all new compact Subaru Leone.

The Sambar saw new competitors, the Mazda Porter in 1968, and the Honda Vamos in 1970.

Third generation (1973–1982)

The third generation appeared 10 February 1973, this one nicknamed the "Gōriki (Herculean strength)" Sambar due to an advertising campaign at the time. The first series still carried a two-stroke two-cylinder 356 cc engine but by now water-cooled. The engine code was EK34, the truck received the K71 model code while the van was called K81.

As of February 1976, the engine was upgraded to the EK21 four-stroke water-cooled version introduced in the Rex to reduce emissions. Claimed maximum power remained the same, but at a much higher engine speed (7500 rpm) and with considerably lower torque figures than the earlier two-stroke type. This model saw the introduction of an electric window washer pump to improve driver visibility. Because of regulations changes, only three months later the engine was again upgraded with a 490 cc displacement (EK22) engine of a similar layout for the Sambar 5 (K75 truck, K76 panel van, K85 van). This was naturally sold as the Subaru 500 in export markets. This was in turn soon replaced by a full 550 cc (EK23) model, the K77/87 of March 1977. In export, the Sambar 550 was known as the Subaru 600.

This model saw the introduction of a sliding side door added on both sides (although a version without the driver's side door remained available), with a full "B" pillar to enhance body stiffness instead of the approach used by the Nissan Prairie which had the front and rear doors interlock. Minor horsepower improvements were introduced in 1977 along with an increase in the width of the vehicle. A sunroof was added to the options list in 1979. 4WD was introduced as an option in 1980, on both the van and truck bodystyles, coinciding with the same feature being offered on the Subaru Rex.

Fourth generation (1982–1990)

May 9, 1982 is when the fourth generation model appeared (KR), with one-box van models marketed as "Sambar Try." The Try was available as a Van with a high or a regular roof, and as a high-roofed passenger model (model code KR). The suspension was upgraded to a four-wheel independent layout with MacPherson struts for the front wheels. The wheel size increased from 10 inches to 12 inches, thereby accommodating larger drum brakes used at all four wheels. The 4WD was available with a dual-range transmission. An automatic clutch was offered in the Sambar Try FL and FX.

While the home market Sambar came equipped with the 544 cc, 2-cylinder  EK23 engine, export versions (known as Subaru 700) received an enlarged 665 cc version of the same, producing . LHD versions were available. In May 1986 retracting seat belts became standard fitment and the TG version of the Sambar Try replaced the earlier TX-G.

January 9, 1987 saw the commercial one-box versions renamed Sambar Van, while the high roofed passenger version retained the Sambar Try name. Front disc brakes were added to the options list. Full-time 4WD was available towards the end of this generations product cycle. In April 1989, a six-valve engine producing  joined the regular engine in high-end versions of the Try and the Sambar truck. The EN05 four-cylinder engine later used in the Rex was never fitted to the KR/KT Sambar, as it would require re-engineering to be a replacement platform. The enlarged Domingo was available with the 3-cylinder EF10 1000 cc engine starting in 1983.

This bigger version of the Sambar was available in Europe from 1983 and went by several names, such as the Subaru Sumo, Libero, Domingo, and Columbuss. The small-bodied version went by the name of Subaru 700 in the few markets where it was available.

The primary difference between the Sambar and the larger-engined variants is the extension of both the front and rear bumpers to aid in occupant protection. The larger Domingo (and its various iterations) isn't considered "kei class" because the dimensions exceed the requirements and the engine displacement is larger than regulations allow.

Fifth generation (1990–1999)

The fifth generation Sambar was introduced in 1990. Engine regulations for displacement size were increased and the Sambar's engine was upgraded to 660 cc. For the 4WD version it sold as Subaru Dias Wagon as a permanent trim model. Commercials in Japan used Kuniko Yamada, a Japanese comedian.

The tradition of using the engine in Subaru's kei car offering was continued, with the Subaru Vivio sharing its EN07 engine with this version of the Sambar. An automatic transmission was offered in the form of Subaru's ECVT system in tandem with full-time 4WD and a viscous coupling differential.

1994 saw a full model change for the Domingo, using the new Sambar design coupled to the Subaru Justy's EF12 SOHC three-cylinder engine displacing 1200 cc. A maximum seating capacity of seven was possible. October 1995 saw the elimination of the ECVT transmission due to drivability issues and a 3-speed automatic was made available instead. A new option for naturally aspirated versions was the EMPi engine, producing .

Special edition appearance packages were offered including a retro "Dias Classic", later available on the Sambar truck, influenced by the Subaru Vivio Bistro. A Sambar Dias Classic appears in Love Hina as Seta's van.

Sixth generation (1999-2012)

The sixth generation was available for purchase May 2, 1999, and in 1998 kei class vehicle size regulations allowed for an increase in body size. Carburetors are no longer used on the current version of the Subaru EN engine for the entire product line, and the EF engine is no longer manufactured.

July 18, 2008, items that were included were dual front passenger airbags, power sliding rear doors, power windows, and leather interior on upper trim level models.

Seventh generation (2009-2014)
On June 26 2007 an article appeared in the Japanese newspaper Nikkan Kogyo Shimbun, claiming that due to the investment by Toyota in Fuji Heavy Industries, the parent company of Subaru, all production of kei class vehicles made by Subaru would end and be replaced by Toyota-owned Daihatsu models rebadged as Subarus. This would allow Subaru to focus on their core business of four-wheel-drive family cars with horizontally opposed engines; kei car sales are almost entirely limited to the domestic Japanese market and were not cost effective for such a small manufacturer. 

In September 2009, the passenger version of the Sambar introduced as the Subaru Dias Wagon, a rebadged version of the Daihatsu Atrai van.  The seventh generation of the Sambar truck was later introduced to Japan on April 2, 2012 as a badge engineered Daihatsu Hijet Van/Truck, but the passenger variant (Dias Wagon) had already been produced since 2009. This is the first time the Sambar is a semi-cabover vehicle, the engine was installed in the front of the vehicle, between the front passengers, and driven by the rear wheels, and continuing to offer on demand four-wheel-drive. In 2014, the Sambar truck was discontinued and updated to S500 Hijet generation, while the Sambar van/Dias Wagon stayed on the S321 platform.

Eighth generation (2014-present)

The eighth-generation Sambar Truck was introduced in Japan on September 2, 2014 as a rebadged tenth-generation Daihatsu Hijet Truck.

The eighth-generation Sambar Van was introduced in Japan in January 2022 as a rebadged eleventh-generation Daihatsu Hijet Cargo, which is built on the DNGA platform. The Dias Wagon passenger van was renamed to Sambar Dias.

Gallery

References

External links

 Samber Truck｜SUBARU(Japanese)
 Samber Van｜SUBARU(Japanese)
 All Subaru Sambar models since 1961 (German language)
 Subaru Sambar Discussion Forum
 SUBARU-SAMBAR (Subaru Official Site in Japanese)
 Subaru Sambar Van Specifications from Kei Cars Canada
 Subaru Sambar Mini Truck Features
 subaru Mini trucks Maintenance and custom from japan

Sambar
Microvans
Pickup trucks
Cab over vehicles
Kei trucks
Vehicles with CVT transmission
All-wheel-drive vehicles
Rear-engined vehicles
Rear-wheel-drive vehicles
Vehicles introduced in 1961